Lake Wimico is a lake located near Port St. Joe in Gulf County, Florida, and connects through White City, Gulf County, Florida.

The lake gave its name to the Lake Wimico and St. Joseph Canal and Railroad Company, the first steam railway in Florida which opened in 1836.

References

Lakes of Florida
Lakes of Gulf County, Florida